Thalassolituus is an oil degrading bacterial genus from the family of Oceanospirillaceae. Thalassolituus is a gram negative, rod shaped marine bacteria. S.I. Paul et al. (2021) isolated and characterized Thalassolituus species (Thalassolituus marinus) from marine sponge (Cliona carteri) of the Saint Martin's Island of the Bay of Bengal, Bangladesh.

References

Further reading 
 
 

Oceanospirillales
Bacteria genera